Sandro Tsirekidze (1894–1923) was a Georgian poet, Symbolist.

Born in Kutaisi, he graduated from the school course in 1912 and then continued his studies at St. Petersburg University. Because of health problems he moved to Kiev University. In 1916 he became one of the founder members of the Symbolist group Blue Horns.

In 1920s he established writers corporation "Writers Publishing Cooperative." At the same time he founded the publishing house "Kirchkhibi." His first book "Mtvareulebi" was published in 1921.

He died in 1923, in the summer. He was buried at the Vera Cemetery.

References 

 The website dedicated to Paolo Iashvili.

1894 births
1923 deaths
Male poets from Georgia (country)
Symbolist poets
People from Kutaisi
20th-century poets from Georgia (country)
20th-century male writers